The EtherCON is a ruggedized and lockable connector for Ethernet over twisted pair wiring. It is manufactured by Neutrik and is designed for professional audio and stage lighting network applications.

Design
The design is modeled after the XLR connector with a circular hard metal shell and a locking latch. The cable connector is always male and is designed to fit over a standard 8P8C modular connector. The chassis connector is always female and has the standard form factor of an XLR panel connector.  The chassis connector may be mated with an EtherCON connector and a standard 8P8C plug.  The chassis connectors are rated for either Cat 5e, Cat 6 or 6A compatibility, with the Cat 5e and 6A models being cross-compatible. (The Cat 6 model utilizes a different shell design from the other models.) Neutrik makes two styles of the connector, one for assembly before the 8P8C plug is attached, and one that will fit over a pre-attached plug.

When sealing gaskets are used, EtherCON is capable of providing a waterproof cable connection for harsh environments.

Applications
EtherCON connectors are used on many audio over Ethernet and audio over IP products. EtherCON connectors are also used to transfer data across large LED displays in both indoor and outdoor settings.

References 

Networking hardware
Ethernet
Computer connectors
Audio engineering